11.22.63 is an American science fiction thriller miniseries based on the 2011 novel 11/22/63 by Stephen King, and consisting of eight episodes, in which a time traveler attempts to stop the assassination of John F. Kennedy. The series is executive-produced by J. J. Abrams, King, Bridget Carpenter, and Bryan Burk, and produced by James Franco, who also starred in the main role. It premiered on Hulu on February 15, 2016, and was received positively by critics.

Premise
Jake Epping (James Franco), a recently divorced English teacher from Lisbon, Maine, is presented with the chance to travel back in time to 1960 by his long-time friend Al Templeton (Chris Cooper). He is persuaded into going in an attempt to prevent the assassination of United States President John F. Kennedy on November 22, 1963; however, he becomes attached to the life he makes in the past, which could be the mission's undoing. He must find a way to secretly gather information about people and events leading up to the assassination while also creating and maintaining a new life to avoid suspicion.

Cast and characters

Main

 James Franco as Jake Epping / George Amberson
 Chris Cooper as Al Templeton
 Sarah Gadon as Sadie Dunhill
 Lucy Fry as Marina Oswald
 George MacKay as Bill Turcotte
 Daniel Webber as Lee Harvey Oswald

Recurring and guest

 Cherry Jones as Marguerite Oswald
 Kevin J. O'Connor as the Yellow-card Man
 T. R. Knight as Johnny Clayton
 Josh Duhamel as Frank Dunning
 Joanna Douglas as Doris Dunning
 Nick Searcy as Deke Simmons
 Jonny Coyne as George de Mohrenschildt
 Tonya Pinkins as Mimi Corcoran
 Brooklyn Sudano as Christy Epping
 Leon Rippy as Harry Dunning
 Juliette Angelo as Bobbi Jill Allnut
 Braeden Lemasters as Mike Coslaw
 Anthony Colonello as Clifford
 Gregory North as General Edwin Walker
 Gil Bellows as Agent Hosty
 Grantham Coleman as Bonnie Ray Williams
 Michael O'Neill as Arliss Price
 Annette O'Toole as Edna Price
 Antoni Corone as Jack Ruby
 Bob Stephenson as Silent Mike
 Wilbur Fitzgerald as Captain Will Fritz
 Constance Towers as Old Sadie
 Kelly McCormack as Dawn

Episodes

Production

Development
In August 2011, before the novel's release, it was announced that Jonathan Demme had attached himself to write, produce, and direct a film adaptation of 11/22/63 with King serving as executive producer. However, in December 2012, Demme announced that he had withdrawn from the project, after disagreeing with King over what to include in the script.

On April 26, 2013, it was reported that Warner Bros. Television and J. J. Abrams' Bad Robot Productions were in negotiations for the rights to adapt the novel as a TV series or miniseries. On September 22, 2014, it was announced that a TV series based on the novel was picked up by Hulu. Carol Spier would be a production designer. The first trailer for the series was released on November 19, 2015.

When asked about developing a sequel series, King stated, "I'd love to revisit Jake and Sadie, and also revisit the rabbit hole that dumps people into the past, but sometimes it's best not to go back for a second helping."

Casting
James Franco was chosen to star as the character of Jake Epping. After reading the novel, Franco contacted King about the rights to adapt it to film only to be told that Abrams had already acquired them. Franco wrote an essay about the book for Vice, which was noticed by Abrams, and tweeted about his disappointment at not getting the film rights, which was noticed by Bridget Carpenter. Soon after, they offered him the lead role. He accepted the role under the condition that he would be able to direct part of the series. Sarah Gadon was cast for the role of Sadie Dunhill. She was interested in the role in part because it gave her the opportunity to work with Abrams.

Filming
Filming began on June 9, 2015, in Hespeler, Ontario. Filming during June 2015 also took place in Guelph, Ontario, as well as in Ayr, Ontario, at the Queen's Tavern, Hamilton, Ontario, and in Knowles Restaurant in Dunnville, Ontario, during September 2015. In early October, the production moved to Dallas to film exterior locations at Dealey Plaza. During this time, the filming of various scenes during rush hour caused bumper to bumper traffic in the surrounding streets.

Reception
The show has garnered positive reviews from most critics. Based on 64 reviews, the show carries an 83% "certified fresh" rating, with an average percentage of 7.19/10, on review aggregator website Rotten Tomatoes where the consensus states: "Though the execution feels almost as dated as the period it represents, 11.22.63 gradually reveals a compelling, well-performed series of events." On Metacritic, the show has a rating of 69 out of 100, based on 35 reviews, signifying "generally positive reviews".

Jack Moore of GQ commented that "the show is moody and supernatural, while somehow also remaining grounded and full of heart", and lauded Franco as the show's standout, saying "what Franco gives is a vanity-free, indulgence-free performance that feels like the work of an Old Hollywood legend. It's earnest and full-hearted." Alan Sepinwall also acclaimed Franco, stating "Franco's a revelation as Jake. He's an immensely talented actor and he's got the star quality you need to carry something this crazy, and this long." Vicki Hyman of the Newark Star-Ledger praised the performances of Franco and Gadon, writing: "Their stirring romance carries with it the same whiff of doom as Epping's visits to Dealey Plaza, and gives what could be merely an interesting and handsomely-made take on the conspiracy thriller genre more texture and depth, resonating across the ages." Hank Stuever of The Washington Post wrote that "King's work doesn't always happily travel through the portal connecting the page to the TV screen, but Hulu scores with an impressively stout-hearted, eight-part adaptation of 11/22/63."

On the other hand, Jeff Jensen of Entertainment Weekly had a more mixed reaction and criticized Franco's performance, calling it "low-watt" and "disinterested". He wrote "11.22.63 reaches some thoughtful, moving conclusions, but oh, what could have been with a more engaged star. If only there were a time machine to fix that mistake." Caroline Framke of Vox describes Franco's performance as inconsistent from scene to scene, but also that the show itself creates even more ambiguity with his character. She wrote "While he's technically old enough to portray 37-year-old Jake, Franco certainly doesn't read as anywhere close to 37, or the world-weariness Jake's supposed to exhibit"  Slate author Willa Paskin believes though Franco is well known and well accomplished, he can't seem to get the "average guy" act right for this series.

Accolades

Home media
11.22.63 was released on DVD and Blu-ray on August 9, 2016, in Region 1. The release includes all eight episodes, as well as a special feature titled "When the Future Fights Back", where King, Abrams, Carpenter and Franco talk about elements of the production that turned King's novel into an event series.

See also
 List of original programs distributed by Hulu

References

External links 

 
 
 

2010s American drama television miniseries
2016 American television series debuts
2016 American television series endings
English-language television shows
Hulu original programming
Saturn Award-winning television series
Television shows based on works by Stephen King
Television series by Warner Bros. Television Studios
Television series by Bad Robot Productions
American time travel television series
Television series set in the 1960s
Television series set in 1963
Television shows set in Kentucky
Television shows set in Maine
Television shows set in Texas
Television shows filmed in Ontario
Television shows filmed in Texas
Television shows about the assassination of John F. Kennedy
Cultural depictions of Lee Harvey Oswald
Cultural depictions of Jack Ruby
American thriller television series
2010s American mystery television series
2010s American science fiction television series
Films about the assassination of John F. Kennedy
2010s American time travel television series